Juri Kinnunen (born 9 March 1990) is a Finnish professional footballer who plays for TPS as a left back.

Career
On 22 December 2018, KPV announced the signing of Kinnunen.

References

1990 births
Living people
Finnish footballers
Klubi 04 players
FC Viikingit players
PK-35 Vantaa (men) players
Turun Palloseura footballers
Kokkolan Palloveikot players
Veikkausliiga players
Ykkönen players
Association football defenders